To Hell with God is the tenth studio album by American death metal band Deicide. The follow-up to Till Death Do Us Part (2008), it was originally intended to be released in 2009 before being pushed back to a 2010 release, and was finally released on February 21, 2011, through Century Media Records. It is the last Deicide album to feature guitarist Ralph Santolla, and the first not to be produced by drummer Steve Asheim since Scars of the Crucifix (2004); instead To Hell with God was produced by Mark Lewis. A claymation video for "Conviction" was released through Century Media's YouTube channel on February 27, 2012.

Track listing

Personnel
 Glen Benton – bass, vocals
 Steve Asheim – drums
 Ralph Santolla – lead guitar
 Jack Owen – rhythm guitar
 "Grim Twins" art studio – design

Charts

References

Deicide (band) albums
2011 albums
Century Media Records albums
Albums produced by Mark Lewis (music producer)